Samuel Cohen (14 July 1812 – 4 November 1861) was an English-born Australian politician and businessman.

Cohen was born at Lambeth to merchant Barnett Cohen and his wife Sierlah (sarah). He came to Australia, arriving in Sydney on 19 April 1834, aboard the Resource. He had been sent by his father to take his brothers, David and Lewis, back to England, but was unsuccessful in doing so.

Business Interests 

From 1835 he lived at Maitland, and partnered with Lewis Levy, later also a politician.

In 1836 he co-founded a general merchants company with his brother David, operating out of Sydney and Newcastle.

Politics 

In 1860 Cohen was elected to the New South Wales Legislative Assembly for Morpeth in a by-election, but he was defeated at the general election later that year.

Personal life 

On 23 August 1837 he married Rachel Nathan, with whom he had seven children.

Samuel Cohen died suddenly, in Sydney, on 4 November 1861. The Empire reported that "the mournful cortege consisted of a hearse, fourteen mourning coaches, and seventy-two carriages...As the funeral passed through the different streets, large numbers of spectators assembled to witness it; thus showing the general esteem in which the deceased gentleman was held by all sections of the community."

Cohen's wife, Rachel, died in London on 26 October 1893.

See also 

 Cintra House, Maitland#The David Cohen Company in Australia

References

External links 

 Obituaries Australia, Samuel Cohen. Retrieved 14 June 2020.
 Australian Jewish Historical Society; Journal and Proceedings, volume 6, September 1969, pp 334–343. Samuel Cohen, an early Settler and a Parliamentarian with a Conscience. 
 Australian Jewish Historical Society; Journal and Proceedings, volume 9, No. 8, 1985. David Cohen & Co; The Family and the Firm, an Anglo-Jewish Story.

 

1812 births
1861 deaths
Members of the New South Wales Legislative Assembly
19th-century Australian politicians
Jewish Australian politicians